Fearless (styled as Fe@rLeSS_) is a 2020 computer-animated science fiction comedy film directed by Cory Edwards, written by Cory Edwards and John Murphy. The film was produced by Vanguard Animation, and was released on Netflix on August 14, 2020. Featuring the voices of Gabrielle Union, Jadakiss, Miguel J. Pimentel, Yara Shahidi and Miles Robbins, the story follows two high school seniors as they try to return three babies to the video game they came from after they mysteriously arrive on Earth. The film received mixed reviews.

Plot 
Reid, who goes by the username "Fe@rLeSS_" is a teen video gamer who is an expert at the superhero action-adventure video game Planet Master. While battling in the second to last level, the game's protagonist, Captain Darius Lightspeed, reveals he has three children, Kira, Xander, and Titus, all of whom he brought to the battle with him. In-game, Reid decides to drop them off at a daycare before he plays the final level of the game, where Lightspeed attaches an "interplanetary communicator" to one of the babies so the daycare workers can call Lightspeed in case of emergency. While in daycare, the game's antagonist and Lightspeed's nemesis, Dr. Arcannis steals the babies and imprisons them on his spaceship in order to attempt to steal their superpowers so he can conquer Earth.

While in captivity, the babies accidentally use their powers to escape, and end up mistakenly walking into an escape pod and launching it towards Earth in the real world. The United States Armed Forces, headed by General Jayne Blazerhatch, detects the aircraft which entered American airspace. The escape pod ends up crashing in front of Reid's home. Meanwhile, Melanie, Reid's school partner, arrives at his house to complete a science project together. Melanie and Reid are both shocked to discover the babies who have entered the home, and after a debate on what to do, Reid convinces her the babies came from the game, and they decide to take care of them. Meanwhile, Arcannis has tracked the babies' whereabouts to Reid's home, and the military brainstorms ideas on what to do.

The following morning, Reid discovers the interplanetary communicator, and gets a call from Lightspeed, who explains that those are his babies and that he will track their location to retrieve them, also explaining that Arcannis is after them; one of the babies however throws down the communicator, breaking it and making Lightspeed unable to finish the location tracking. Melanie suggests to Reid that they have to get away from their home in order to stay safe, and the two do so. Arcannis arrives at the home after they left, vowing to find them. The military later captures Reid, Melanie and the babies, believing the babies to be dangerous aliens. Arcannis proceeds to arrive, and after defeating the military, steals the babies and transports them to his ship.

Reid steals a motorcycle from the military in order to follow Dr. Arcannis' tracks, and Melanie fixes the interplanetary communicator by wiring it to a military handheld transceiver, and they manage to successfully contact Lightspeed, allowing Lightspeed to track their location, also informing him that Dr. Arcannis has stolen the babies. Reid and Melanie then successfully stowaway on Arcannis' ship. The ship lands at a major city, where the military awaits, and Melanie and Reid escape from the ship with an escape pod taking the babies with them, landing near the ship in the same city; Arcannis transforms into a larger and more powerful form of himself, and unleashes his robot airforce which the military is unsuccessful at stopping. As he approaches Melanie and Reid, the babies learn to control their superpowers and fight back, destroying the robot army and defeating Arcannis by destroying an electric device on his neck which gave him the power to become larger. Lightspeed arrives after the battle finishes, and is relieved to find that the babies have learned to use their superpowers, also hailing Reid and Melanie as heroes. Lightspeed and his children then return to the video game world.

Cast 
 Yara Shahidi as Melanie
 Miles Robbins as Reid
 Miguel as Dr. Arcannis
 Jadakiss as Captain Lightspeed
 Tom Kenny as Fleech
 Angie Martinez as Zona Nightweather
 Harland Williams as Elliot aka Buckethead
 Fat Joe as DJ
 Amari McCoy as Kira
 Dwyane Wade as Private Wade
 Gabrielle Union as General Jayne Nadia Blazerhatch
 Susan Sarandon as Mom

Music

Soundtrack

Reception 

Writing for Polygon, Tasha Robinson wrote:  "Fearless isn’t terrible, but no one involved seems to have put in a level of effort that feels like they got up off that imaginary couch."

References

External links
 
 

2020 films
2020 computer-animated films
2020 comedy films
Vanguard Animation
2020 science fiction films
2020s English-language films